Gaizka Ayesa Burgui (born 2 April 2001) is a Spanish professional footballer who plays as a goalkeeper for CD Numancia, on loan from Real Sociedad.

Club career
Ayesa was born in Ansoáin, Navarre, and joined Real Sociedad's youth setup in 2013, aged 12. He made his senior debut with the C-team on 2 March 2019, starting in a 7–1 Tercera División home routing of SD Deusto.

Ayesa first appeared with the reserves on 12 January 2020, starting in a 2–0 away win against Burgos CF in the Segunda División B championship. On 4 February 2021, he renewed his contract with the Txuri-urdin until 2025, and was sparingly used during the campaign as his side returned to Segunda División after 59 years.

Ayesa made his professional debut on 29 August 2021, starting in a 0–0 home draw against CF Fuenlabrada. On 9 July of the following year, he was loaned to Primera Federación side CD Numancia for the season.

References

External links

2001 births
Living people
People from Cuenca de Pamplona
Spanish footballers
Footballers from Navarre
Association football goalkeepers
Segunda División players
Segunda División B players
Tercera División players
Real Sociedad C footballers
Real Sociedad B footballers
CD Numancia players